Big Creek Township is one of seventeen rural townships in Black Hawk County, Iowa, USA.  As of the 2000 census, its population was 2640.

Geography
According to the USGS, it contains one cemetery, Westview.

References

External links
 US-Counties.com
 City-Data.com

Townships in Black Hawk County, Iowa
Waterloo – Cedar Falls metropolitan area
Townships in Iowa